"Growl" ( Eureureong;  Páoxiào) is a song recorded by South Korean–Chinese boy band Exo, released on August 5, 2013, for the repackaged edition of their first studio album Growl. It was released in both Korean and Chinese versions by their label SM Entertainment. The song is known as Exo's breakthrough single, with over two million downloads in South Korea.

Release and promotion
Composed by Hyuk Shin, DK, Jordan Kyle, John Major and Jarah Gibson, "Growl" is described as a dance-pop song with contemporary R&B and funk influences. After its release was announced, a video filming the group practicing the song's choreography was leaked online on July 27. Exo began performing the song on South Korean music TV shows on August 1 before it was officially released together with the album on August 5, 2013. They also performed the song on several Chinese TV shows.

The song was performed during the closing ceremony for the 2018 Winter Olympics in Pyeongchang, along with their 2017 song "Power".

Music videos
The Korean and Chinese music videos for "Growl" were released on August 1, 2013, four days ahead of the song itself. They exclusively feature Exo's performance of the song at a dimly lit warehouse and utilized the one shot style, appearing to have been filmed in a single take. Another set of music videos for the song, filmed at a different location, were released on August 20, 2013. On May 29, 2019, the Korean music video surpassed 200 million views on YouTube, becoming their fourth music video to do so.

Reception

Music charts
"Growl" reached number 2 on South Korea's Gaon Digital Chart, as well as number 3 on the Billboard Korea K-Pop Hot 100 and World Digital Songs charts. Billboard listed "Growl" as the fifth best-selling K-pop song in America during 2013. The song also won first place 14 times in total on South Korean music TV shows.

Describing it as "the crown jewel in EXO's fantastic 2013", Billboard picked "Growl" as the best K-pop song of 2013. It was named Song of the Year at the 2013 Melon Music Awards and KBS Song Festival. The song is Exo's best-selling single to date, having accumulated over two million downloads.

Public reception
In July 2017, defectors from North Korea stated Exo has some popularity in North Korea, although people have to listen to them in secret and don't know what the members look like, and Growl in particular is used as a confession song amongst youth to confess to one's crush due to the lyrics.

Accolades

Charts

Weekly charts

Year-end charts

Sales

References

External links

Exo songs
2013 songs
2013 singles
Korean-language songs
Mandarin-language songs
SM Entertainment singles
Songs written by Jordan Kyle